Ó Droighneáin, Gaelic-Irish surname.

Background

Ó Droighneáin was a surname of at least two different septs, located in Counties Cork and Galway, but has been 'translated' as Thornton, an English surname. "[Thornton] is a portmanteau English name for Ó Draighneáin, Mac Sceacháin, Ó Toráin. The connection is: draighean, blackthorn; sceach, whitethorn; tor, a bush. MacLysaght remarks that some Thorntons in Limerick were 16 cent planters." .

Ó Droighneáin remains in use as an Irish-language surname.

Bearers of the surname

Micheál Ó Droigheaín, An Spidéal-born Irish Volunteer and IRA commander, 1889-1964
Pádraig Thornton, alias Proinsias Ó Draighneáin, Drogheda-born member of IRB and Irish Volunteers, d. 1936
Muiris Ó Droighneáin, Charleville-born Irish scholar, 1901–79
Mícheál Ó Droighneáin, actor and director, fl. 1930
Máirtín Ó Droighneáin, An Spidéal-born boxer, 1916–84
Áine Ní Dhroigneáin, Sean-Nós singer and actor
Máire Uí Droighneáin, Ros na Rún actor
Eoin Ó Droighneáin, Irish socialist
Muireann Ni Dhroighneain, actress
Sailí Ní Dhroighneáin, sean-nós singer and musician, 2014 Fleadh Cheoil winner

See also

 Kevin Thornton (chef), Tipperary-born chef
 Kevin Thornton (footballer)
 Michael Thornton (Medal of Honor, awarded 1884)
 Sean Thornton, Drogheda-born  professional footballer
 Sean Thornton (The Quiet Man)
 James Thornton (Computer Pioneer)

External links
https://www.johngrenham.com/findasurname.php?surname=thornton

Surnames
Irish families
Surnames of Irish origin
Irish-language surnames
Families of Irish ancestry